The 1941 Denver Pioneers football team was an American football team that represented the University of Denver as member of the Mountain States Conference (MSC) during the 1941 college football season. In their third season under head coach Cac Hubbard, the Pioneers compiled a 4–3–2 record (3–1–2 against conference opponents), tied for second place in RMC, and outscored opponents by a total of 141 to 46.

Schedule

References

Denver
Denver Pioneers football seasons
Denver Pioneers football